Charles Edward Gauer (September 24, 1941 – October 22, 1973) was a professional football player, and later an assistant coach, for the Philadelphia Eagles of the National Football League. However, he was also a member of the "Steagles," a team that was the result of a temporary merger between the Eagles and Pittsburgh Steelers due to the league-wide manning shortages in 1943 brought on by World War II.

As an assistant coach, he helped develop the wide receivers and tight ends for the Philadelphia Eagles from 1952-1961 and 1969-1970.

References

List of Colgate Raiders players
"The Steagles"—Saved Pro Football During World War II''
NCAA News Bulletin -Mentions Gauer's death

1921 births
1973 deaths
Colgate Raiders football players
National Football League announcers
Philadelphia Eagles announcers
Philadelphia Eagles coaches
Philadelphia Eagles players
Players of American football from Illinois
Steagles players and personnel